Brian or Bryan Kavanagh may refer to:
 Brian P. Kavanagh (born 1967), member of the New York State Senate
 Brian Kavanagh (filmmaker) (born 1935), Australian writer and filmmaker
 Brian Kavanagh (Gaelic footballer) (born 1985), Gaelic football player

See also
 Brian Cavanaugh (fl. 1980s–2000s), ice hockey coach
 Brian W. Cavanaugh (fl. 1990s–2020s), United States Marine Corps general